The 2020 VBA season was the fifth season of the Vietnam Basketball Association. The season was scheduled to start in May but was postponed due to the COVID-19 pandemic. The regular season began on 15 October 2020 and ended on 20 November. The playoffs semi-finals began on 24 November 2020 and ended on 28 November 2020. The Finals began on 2 December 2020 and ended on 8 December 2020 with the Saigon Heat defeating the Thang Long Warriors after 4 games.

Teams

Venues and locations
Due to the COVID-19 pandemic, all games will be played in a bubble in Ho Chi Minh City. A stadium, nicknamed the VBA Arena, was constructed in Studio S4 on the campus of ZoOm Media.

Personnel and sponsorship

Heritage players
The following is the list of Vietnamese heritage players, which had played for their respective teams at least once. Each team can register 1 heritage player. Flags indicate the citizenship/s the player holds.

Imports
The following is the list of imports, which had played for their respective teams at least once. Each team can register 1 import. Flags indicate the citizenship/s the player holds.

Managerial changes

Drafts

Regular season

Standings

Playoffs

Bracket

Semifinals
Note: All times are ICT (UTC+7) as listed by the VBA. All games were played at the VBA Arena in Ho Chi Minh City.

(1) Saigon Heat vs. (4) Cantho Catfish

(2) Thang Long Warriors vs. (3) Hanoi Buffaloes

Finals
Note: All times are ICT (UTC+7) as listed by the VBA. All games were played at the VBA Arena in Ho Chi Minh City.

(1) Saigon Heat vs. (2) Thang Long Warriors

Statistics

Individual statistic leaders

Team statistic leaders

Awards

Yearly awards
Moment of the Year: Phạm Quang Minh
Handle of the Year: Christian Juzang (Saigon Heat)
Assist of the Year: Sang Dinh (Hanoi Buffaloes)
Buzzer Beater of the Year: Võ Huy Hoàn (Hochiminh City Wings)
Block of the Year: Joshua Keyes (Saigon Heat)
Dunk of the Year: Raheem Watts (Hochiminh City Wings)
Favorite Player of the Year: Christian Juzang (Saigon Heat)
Rookie of the Year: Lê Quang (Saigon Heat)
Most Improved Player of the Year: Nguyễn Hoàng Tuấn (Danang Dragons)
Sportsmanship of the Year: Mike Bell (Hanoi Buffaloes)
Sixth Man of the Year: Nguyễn Tiến Dương (Hanoi Buffaloes)
Defensive Player of the Year: Leon Hampton (Cantho Catfish)
Local Player of the Year: Lê Ngọc Tú (Hochiminh City Wings)
Heritage Player of the Year: Christian Juzang (Saigon Heat)
Coach of the Year: Kevin Yurkus (Saigon Heat)
Most Valuable Player of the Year: Robert Crawford (Thang Long Warriors)

MVP of the Week

References

External links
 Official website

Vietnam Basketball Association seasons
2020–21 in Vietnamese basketball
2020–21 in Asian basketball leagues